Mount Bayard is a  glaciated mountain located in the Boundary Ranges on the international boundary line of Alaska and British Columbia. Precipitation runoff from the peak and meltwater from the Boundary and Salmon Glaciers that surround the peak drains into the Salmon River. Weather permitting, the mountain can be seen from the gravel Granduc Mine Road at Hyder, Alaska.

History

Mount Lindeborg was the name adopted for this feature in 1921, however by 1924 it was renamed Mount Bayard in lieu of Lindeborg. The Mount Lindeborg name was transferred to the peak  immediately west. Mount Bayard was named by the International Boundary Commission for Thomas F. Bayard (1828-1898), a diplomat and United States Senator. The mountain's toponym was officially adopted July 31, 1927, by the Geographical Names Board of Canada. The mountain is also known as Boundary Peak 15.

Climate
Based on the Köppen climate classification, Mount Bayard is located in the marine west coast climate zone of western North America. Most weather fronts originate in the Pacific Ocean, and travel east toward the Coast Mountains where they are forced upward by the range (Orographic lift), causing them to drop their moisture in the form of rain or snowfall. As a result, the Coast Mountains experience high precipitation, especially during the winter months in the form of snowfall. Temperatures can drop below −20 °C with wind chill factors below −30 °C.

See also

List of Boundary Peaks of the Alaska–British Columbia/Yukon border
Geography of British Columbia
Geography of Alaska

References

External links
 Flickr: Photo of summit
 Flickr: Salmon Glacier and Mt. Bayard
 Weather forecast: Mount Bayard
 YouTube: Mt. Bayard seen from road

One-thousanders of British Columbia
Boundary Ranges
Mountains of Alaska